GW 788388 is a synthetic compound which acts as a potent and selective inhibitor for TGF beta receptor 1. It has applications in research into various disorders such as liver, kidney and heart disease (especially associated with Chagas disease), and potential antiviral properties.

See also
 Galunisertib
 LY-2109761

References 

Kinase inhibitors